Iroquois-class homeodomain protein IRX-5, also known as Iroquois homeobox protein 5, is a protein that in humans is encoded by the IRX5 gene.

Function 

IRX5 is a member of the Iroquois homeobox gene family. Members of this family appear to play multiple roles during pattern formation of vertebrate embryos. First described in a 2012 study by Reversade and colleagues, the loss of IRX5 in humans causes Hamamy Syndrome, a recessive developmental disorder mainly affecting the heart, long bones, and craniofacial structures.

References

Further reading

External links